Hippotion stigma is a moth of the family Sphingidae. It is known from arid regions of eastern and northern Kenya, Ethiopia and Somalia.

References

 Pinhey, E. (1962): Hawk Moths of Central and Southern Africa. Longmans Southern Africa, Cape Town.

Hippotion
Moths described in 1903
Moths of Africa